Distyrax is a genus of trilobites in the order Phacopida, that existed during the lower Silurian in what is now Greenland. It was described by Philip D. Lane in 1988, and the type species is Distyrax peeli. It also contains the species, Distyrax cooperi. The type locality was the Odins Fjord Formation.

References

External links
 Distyrax at the Paleobiology Database

Encrinuridae genera
Silurian trilobites of Europe
Fossils of Greenland
Paleozoic life of the Northwest Territories